Myrmecia imaii is a species of ant in the genus Myrmecia. Described by Robert Taylor in 2015, the species is endemic to Australia in Western Australia, particularly in very south-western areas.

References

Myrmeciinae
Hymenoptera of Australia
Insects described in 2015
Insects of Australia